Dibromoacetylene is a molecular chemical compound containing acetylene, with its hydrogen substituted by bromine.

Production
Dibromoacetylene can be made by  reacting 1,1,2-tribromoethylene with potassium hydroxide. This method has a danger of causing explosions.

Another way is to react acetylene with phenyl lithium (at −50 °C) to make lithium acetylide, which then reacts with bromine to yield the product.

Yet another way is to react acetylene with sodium hypobromite NaOBr.

Properties
Dibromoacetylene is explosive and sensitive to air. Its appearance is a clear water like liquid. It has a sweetish smell, but makes a white fume in air that then smells like ozone, possibly because it forms ozone. Dibromoacetylene is lachrymatory.

Dibromoacetylene can be polymerised to polydibromoacetylene using catalysts like titanium tetrachloride and triethylaluminium. Polydibromoacetylene is black, electrically conducting, and stable in air to over 200 °C.

The infrared spectrum has absorption at 2185 cm−1 due to symmetrical stretching on the C≡C bond, 832 cm−1 asymmetrical stretch on C-Br bond, 311 cm−1 bending on Z shape BrCC, 267 symmetrical stretch on all bonds, and 167 cm−1 for C shaped bending.

Reactions
In air dibromoacetylene spontaneously inflames producing black sooty smoke and a red flame. When heated, it explodes, yielding carbon and other substances. A slower reaction with oxygen and water, yields oxalic acid and hydrobromic acid and other bromine containing substances. A reaction with hydrogen iodide yields dibromoiodoethylene.
Dibromoacetylene reacts with bromine to yield tetrabromoethene.

Dibromoacetylene reacts with Apiezon L, which is used as a vacuum grease in distillation, so its use is unsuitable with this chemical.

References

Dihaloacetylenes
Organobromides